Galactosylceramide sulfotransferase is an enzyme that in humans is encoded by the GAL3ST1 gene.

Sulfonation, an important step in the metabolism of many drugs, xenobiotics, hormones, and neurotransmitters, is catalyzed by sulfotransferases. The product of this gene is galactosylceramide sulfotransferase which catalyzes the conversion between 3'-phosphoadenylylsulfate + a galactosylceramide to adenosine 3',5'-bisphosphate + galactosylceramide sulfate. Activity of this sulfotransferase is enhanced in renal cell carcinoma.

References

Further reading